The People of the Mist is a classic lost race fantasy novel written by H. Rider Haggard. It was first published serially in the weekly magazine Tit-Bits, between December 1893 and August 1894; the first edition in book form was published in London by Longman in October, 1894. It was reprinted in December, 1973 by Ballantine Books as the sixty-third paperback volume of the Ballantine Adult Fantasy series.

Plot
The People of the Mist is the tale of a British adventurer seeking wealth in the wilds of Africa, finding romance, and discovering a lost race and its monstrous god.

The penniless Leonard Outram attempts to redress the undeserved loss of his family estates by seeking his fortune in Africa. In the course of his adventures, he and his Zulu companion Otter save a young English woman, Juanna Rodd, together with her nursemaid Soa, from slavery. Leonard and Juanna are plainly attracted to each other, but prone to bickering, and their romance is impeded by the watchful and jealous Soa. The protagonists seek the legendary People of the Mist, said to possess a fabulous hoard of jewels. On finding them, they immediately become embroiled in the turbulent political affairs of the lost race, which is driven by a power struggle between its king and the priests of its giant crocodile god. The heroic Outram can do little more than react to events. The action climaxes in a hair-raising escape by tobogganing a large flat stone down a steep glacier.

Reception

Gary Westfahl described The People of the Mist as "Haggard's best African singleton...which effectively engages a reader's attention."

Per ardua ad astra
The motto of the Royal Air Force and other Commonwealth air forces, first adopted a generation after publication, has been attributed to a passage from the book.

References

External links

 
Images and bibliographic information for various editions of The People of the Mist at SouthAfricaBooks.com

1894 British novels
Novels by H. Rider Haggard
1894 fantasy novels
English fantasy novels
Lost world novels
Novels set in Africa
Novels first published in serial form